When You Grow Up is the second studio album by American singer–songwriter Priscilla Ahn. The album was released May 3, 2011 on Blue Note Records.

Critical reception
In a review for AllMusic, critic reviewer Andrew Leahey wrote: "Despite the heavy guest list, When You Grow Up still feels more personal than Ahn’s 2008 debut, which found her dabbling in indie pop, torch songs, and Norah Jones-styled jazz. She focuses on folk this time around, consolidating her strengths while exploring every quirky corner of the genre."

Track listing

References

External links
 
 

2011 albums
Priscilla Ahn albums
Albums produced by Ethan Johns
Blue Note Records albums